Maa Aavida Collector is a 1996 Indian Telugu-language drama film, produced by Kolli Venkateswara Rao and S. Adi Reddy under the Amma Art Creations banner and directed by Kodi Ramakrishna. It stars Jagapati Babu, Prema  and music composed by Vandemataram Srinivas. The film is dubbed into Tamil as En Pondatti Collector.

Plot
The film begins with Sir Parvati Pandit a vainglory woman that takes a stab to trample the destitute along with her brother Thammugi. She has a daughter Indira a benevolent and virtuous whose vocation is to complete I.A.S. Raju a gallant resides in a colony and is admired by everyone therein. Once Parvati Pandit seeks to take hold of their settlement when Raju impedes her, and a clash arises between them. At the same time, Indira is impressed by the idolization of Raju and falls for him. Even he too crushes as unbeknownst of her true self. As soon as, the truth comes to light Raju resents her. Besides, Parvati Pandit rebukes and ostracizes her daughter. At that point, Raju gets there, nuptials Indira and challenges Parvati Pandit to make his wife Collector. From there, Raju strives hard and carves Indira as Collector. The pair leads a cute life and Indira becomes pregnant.

Here begrudged Parvati Pandit ploys to create a rift. Firstly, she counterfeits by striking herself and inducting colony men where Indira's hard feelings toward them begin. Then she callously aborts Indira in name of them and shifts the two to her mansion. Next, she magnifies each case and increases the rupture. Above all, the shrew intrigues and imputes an illicit bond to Raju by bursting a girl Vani into view. As a result, they both split officially with divorce. Vani accompanies Raju and torments him with her coarse behavior which he silently tolerates. Afterward, Raju discovers Vani as his friend Prakash's fiancé whom he incremented and sentenced. Howbeit, he clarifies the reason behind his deed to rescue Prakash and divert him from the bad path. Parallelly, Parvati Pandit is backstabbed by Thammugi who forcibly tries to knit Indira with his son Bujji. Simultaneously, Raju is chopped by acquitted Prakash with misinterpretation. Now Raju has been hospitalized in serious condition. Meanwhile, Indira is a cognizant diabolic shade of Parvati Pandit who chastises her and consumes poison. That reforms Parvati Pandit. At last, Raju revives ceases the knaves, and safeguards his wife, Finally, the movie ends on a happy note with the reunion of the couple.

Cast 

 Jagapati Babu as Raju
 Prema as Meena
 Subhashri as Vani
 Lakshmi as Sir Parvati Pandit
 Costumes Krishna as Thammugi
 Sudhakar as Bujji
 Ananth Babu
 Garimallla Visweswara Rao
 Mukku Narasimha Rao
 Poosala Narasimha Rao
 Silk Smitha as item number
 Y. Vijaya

Soundtrack 

The music for the film was composed by Vandemataram Srinivas and released by Shiva Musicals Audio Company.

References

External links 
 

1995 films
1990s Telugu-language films
Indian romantic drama films
Films directed by Kodi Ramakrishna